The men's long jump event at the 1994 World Junior Championships in Athletics was held in Lisbon, Portugal, at Estádio Universitário de Lisboa on 20 and 21 July.

Medalists

Results

Final
21 July

Qualifications
20 Jul

Group A

Group B

Participation
According to an unofficial count, 35 athletes from 28 countries participated in the event.

References

Long jump
Long jump at the World Athletics U20 Championships